Badhadhe District is a district in the southern Lower Jubba Region of Somalia.
Badhaadhe consist of Ras kamboni, kolbiyow, hosingo, waldena, bulla haji and islands such as kudhaa

References

External links
 Badhaadhe, Jubbada Hoose, Somalia
 Administrative map of Badhadhe District

Districts of Somalia Predominantly settled by Tolomoge and makabul of ogaden subclan.

Lower Juba